Alen Pamić  (15 October 1989 – 21 June 2013) was a Croatian professional footballer who last played for NK Istra 1961.

Personal life 
Alen was the son of Croatia international Igor Pamić, his younger brother Zvonko is also a professional footballer.

Death
He had a history of heart problems, and died on 21 June 2013 while playing indoor football with friends. His death cause was a hypercholesterolemia and coronary artery plaque, similar to that of Russian pair skater Sergei Grinkov.

Career statistics

Honours
Karlovac 
Treća HNL – West: 2007–08

See also
List of association footballers who died while playing

References

External links

1989 births
2013 deaths
People from Istria County
Association football midfielders
Croatian footballers
Croatia youth international footballers
NK Karlovac players
HNK Rijeka players
Standard Liège players
NK Istra 1961 players
Croatian Football League players
Croatian expatriate footballers
Expatriate footballers in Belgium
Croatian expatriate sportspeople in Belgium
Association football players who died while playing
Sport deaths in Croatia